Les Colocataires was a French reality TV program hosted by Frédérique Courtadon and broadcast on the  M6 channel from 7 April 2004 to 19 June 2004. The show was produced by W9 Productions.

Sebastien Charbonneau won the prize.

Principle
The game is based on  Loft Story in which  7 girls and 7 boys are locked up for 10 weeks under the eye of the cameras, and are eliminated progressively by viewers' votes.

The winner receives €150,000 and three years of rent (€1,500 per month). The pool of winnings was donated to a charity.

To avoid accusations of plagiarism of Endemol, copyright owner of Big Brother and Adapted Loft Story, following the relative failure of Loft Story 2, some original features were introduced that included the candidates being divided into two  cities, separated by a wall (the girls on one side, boys on the other) for a few hours a day based on  the model of Friends,  the inspiration of the show. Candidates were not completely cut off from the world and they  were allowed to communicate with their relatives or the public by email or video conferencing, and were able to receive news  from  the outside world.

Candidats

Nominations

External links
http://worldofbigbrother.com/Other/LC/Fra/1/about.shtml

2000s French television series
2004 French television series debuts
2004 French television series endings
French reality television series